1,6-Hexanediol diacrylate (HDDA or HDODA) is a difunctional acrylate ester monomer used in the manufacture of polymers. It is particularly useful for use in ultraviolet light cure applications. Furthermore, it is also used in adhesives, sealants, alkyd coatings, elastomers, photopolymers, and inks for improved adhesion, hardness, abrasion and heat resistance. Like other acrylate monomers it is usually supplied with a radical inhibitor such as hydroquinone added.

Preparation 
The material is prepared by acid-catalyzed esterification of 1,6-hexanediol with acrylic acid.

Other uses

As the molecule has acrylic functionality, it is capable of undergoing the Michael reaction with an amine. This allows it use in epoxy chemistry where its use speeds up the cure time considerably.

See also

 TMPTA (trimethylolpropane triacrylate), a triacrylate crosslinker
 Pentaerythritol tetraacrylate, a tetraacrylate crosslinker

References

External links 
 Safety Data
 Product Stewardship Information

Acrylate esters
Monomers